The Underdog Show was a six-week television series presented by Julian Clary and his dog, Valerie. The series was produced by the independent production company Splash Media.

Format
The show on BBC2 featured celebrities Julia Sawalha, Anton du Beke, Clive Anderson, Huey Morgan, Mishal Husain, Selina Scott, Kirsty Gallacher and Theo Paphitis pairing up with untrained rescue dogs for a Crufts-style competition. Every week, one duo was eliminated by a panel of three professional judges Kay Lawrence, Annie Clayton and Peter Purves and the viewers via telephone voting. The outgoing dog being put up for adoption to find a new home with a viewer, although Theo, Kirsty, and Clive adopted the rescue dogs they were paired with.

Steve Mann of Alpha Dog training School was the successful trainer of eventual winners, Selina and Chump.
Steve Mann, a full-time professional Dog Trainer is considered  one of the best dog trainers in the UK.

A spin off show on CBBC replaced the celebrities with eight children paired up with eight rescue dogs and eight professional dog trainers.

The numbers in brackets e.g. (8th) denote the final position the celebrity finished in, not the order they were eliminated.

Series 2
A second series aired on Living instead of BBC Two. It was hosted by Tara Palmer-Tomkinson and Mark Durden-Smith.

Raef, Jason, Brian and Kevin all adopted the dogs that they were paired with.

The numbers in brackets e.g. (10th) denote the final position the celebrity finished in, not the order they were eliminated.

External links
 

http://livingtv.co.uk/shows/underdog

2007 British television series debuts
BBC Television shows
Television shows about dogs